Tahtavil (also Romanized as Tahtavīl) is a village in Saroleh Rural District, Meydavud District, Bagh-e Malek County, Khuzestan Province, Iran. At the 2006 census, its population was 24, in 5 families.

References 

Populated places in Bagh-e Malek County